The 1971–72 NBA season was the Detroit Pistons' 24th season in the NBA and 15th season in the city of Detroit.  The team played at Cobo Arena in downtown Detroit.

The Pistons finished with a 26-56 (.317) record, 4th place in the Midwest Division.  The team was led guards Dave Bing (22.6 ppg) and Jimmy Walker (21.3 ppg, NBA All-Star) and center Bob Lanier (25.7 ppg, 14.2 rpg, NBA All-Star).  The season began with Butch van Breda Kolff as coach.  He resigned 10 games into the season, replaced briefly by player Terry Dischinger before Earl Lloyd was named as a permanent replacement, as the team dropped from 45 wins the previous season to 26 in the 1971–72 season.

Draft picks

Roster

Regular season

Season standings

z, y – division champions
x – clinched playoff spot

Record vs. opponents

Game log

See also
 1972 in Michigan

References

Detroit
Detroit Pistons seasons
Detroit Pistons
Detroit Pistons
1971 in Detroit
1972 in Detroit